The Spokane Washington Temple is the 59th operating temple of the Church of Jesus Christ of Latter-day Saints (LDS Church).

History
The temple was announced in August 1998, with the groundbreaking taking place on October 10, 1998. During the open house one year later, 52,000 people toured the building. On August 21, 1999, LDS Church president Gordon B. Hinckley dedicated the Spokane Washington Temple, with approximately 16,000 members attending 11 dedication sessions.

The Spokane Washington Temple is located in Spokane County, and serves about 50,000 LDS Church members in eastern Washington, northern Idaho, and western Montana. Its design includes gray granite walls, art glass windows, and a lone spire topped by a golden angel Moroni.

In 2020, along with all the church's other temples, the Spokane Washington Temple was closed for a time in response to the coronavirus pandemic.

See also 

 The Church of Jesus Christ of Latter-day Saints in Washington
 Comparison of temples of The Church of Jesus Christ of Latter-day Saints
 List of temples of The Church of Jesus Christ of Latter-day Saints
 List of temples of The Church of Jesus Christ of Latter-day Saints by geographic region
 Temple architecture (Latter-day Saints)

References

Additional reading

External links 
 Official Spokane Washington Temple page
 Spokane Washington Temple page

20th-century Latter Day Saint temples
Buildings and structures in Spokane, Washington
Culture of Spokane, Washington
The Church of Jesus Christ of Latter-day Saints in Washington (state)
Religious buildings and structures in Washington (state)
Temples (LDS Church) completed in 1999
Temples (LDS Church) in the United States
1999 establishments in Washington (state)